Holmfirth is a town in the Metropolitan Borough of Kirklees, West Yorkshire, England, on the A635 and A6024 in the Holme Valley, at the confluence of the River Holme and Ribble,  south of Huddersfield and  west of Barnsley. It mostly consists of stone-built cottages nestled on the eastern slopes of the Pennine hills.

Historically part of the West Riding of Yorkshire, Holmfirth was a centre for pioneering film-making by Bamforth & Co., which later switched to the production of saucy seaside postcards. Between 1973 and 2010, Holmfirth and the Holme Valley became well known as the filming location of the BBC's situation comedy Last of the Summer Wine.

History
The name Holmfirth derives from Old English holegn ('holly'), in the name of Holme, West Yorkshire, compounded with Middle English frith ('wood'). It thus meant 'the woods at Holme'.

The town originally grew up around a corn mill and bridge in the 13th century. Three hundred years later Holmfirth expanded rapidly as the growing cloth trade grew and the production of stone and slates from the surrounding quarries increased. The present parish church was built in 1778 after the church built in 1476 was swept away in a flood the previous year. Dr Albert Lister Peace was the church's organist, at the age of nine, in the early 1850s. In 1850 Holmfirth railway station opened, on the branch line built by the Lancashire and Yorkshire Railway Company.

Local men who served and died in the First and Second World Wars are commemorated on the Holme Valley War Memorial found outside Holme Valley Memorial Hospital.

Bamforth & Co
Holmfirth was the home of Bamforth & Co Ltd, who were well known for their cheeky seaside postcards – although around the time of the First World War, they produced postcards of a more sober nature. The printing works on Station Road has now been converted into residential flats.

Bamforth's company were early pioneers of film-making, before they abandoned the business in favour of postcards. During the early 1900s Holmfirth was well known for film making; During the periods 1898–1900 and 1913–1915 Bamforth and Co. produced what the British Film Institute describes as 'a modest but historically significant collection of films'.

Flooding

There are a number of instances when flooding has occurred in the Holme Valley affecting Holmfirth and other settlements in the valley. The earliest recorded Holmfirth flood was in 1738 and the most recent was 1944. The most severe flood occurred early on the morning of 5 February 1852, when the embankment of the Bilberry Reservoir collapsed causing the deaths of 81 people. Following a severe storm in 1777 the River Holme burst its banks, sweeping away people and property with the loss of three lives; the stone church built in 1476, was also swept away. A storm in 1821 again caused the river to burst its banks. The flooding on the night of 29 May 1944 was not nationally reported and it was then overshadowed by the D-Day landings the following week.

Description
Holmfirth (and the surrounding countryside) is the setting for the BBC's long-running comedy Last of the Summer Wine. Thousands of tourists flock to the area each year to enjoy scenery and locations familiar from the series. Filming of the TV Slaithwaite-based drama, Where the Heart Is, had also taken place in and around the area.

The former Lodge's supermarket building had been sitting empty in the heart of the town since the Co-op moved to new premises in Crown Bottom. Lodge's was built in the 1970s by the prominent local grocery company. It was opened by Radio 1 DJ Tony Blackburn and occupied an unusual location over the River Holme beside the town's small bus station. Lodge's was bought in the 1990s by Co-operative Retail Services who eventually closed the store down in 1997, after investing in a brand new £2 million supermarket for the town. Local residents, led by the Holme Valley Business Association, campaigned for its demolition. Their campaign was featured in the 2005 Channel 4 documentary, Demolition. The building has since been converted into several smaller shops, including a Sainsbury's Local, with some accommodation on the top floor.

Governance
Until 1974, the area was administered by Holmfirth Urban District Council which was based at the Council Offices in Huddersfield Road in Holmfirth. Since then, Holmfirth has been administered by Kirklees Council. At the lowest tier the local parish council is Holme Valley Parish Council.

Education

Primary education
Holmfirth's only primary school is Holmfirth Junior, Infant, and Nursery School located on Cartworth Road; however, there are many other primary schools in villages and hamlets closely surrounding Holmfirth. In 2017, 82% of the school's student were achieving the expected standard for their age and 12% were exceeding the expected standard.

Secondary education
Holmfirth High School is a coeducational secondary school that takes in students from the local primary schools named above as well as students from neighboring villages and hamlets. The school has over 1,300 pupils, split over five-year groups from years 7 to 11.

Economy
Holmfirth's economy is dominated by rural and tourism activities. A 2013 youth survey identified reducing opportunities for young adults in the area and an intention to leave to find employment. The survey resulted in a successful bid for lottery funding to create new opportunities and training to increase employment opportunities in the area. Tourism economic activity is increasing with several accommodation and tourist pursuits developing in the town including booking software to manage and market accommodation. New holiday accommodation includes that linked to the new Winery in Cartworth Moor.

Longley Farm, founded in 1948, manufacturer of dairy products, is a significant employer in the town.

Sport
On 6 July 2014, Stage 2 of the 2014 Tour de France, from York to Sheffield, passed through the town. The event was televised internationally and attracted huge crowds cheering the riders through the town.
Holmfirth Cycling Club was formed in 2013 and, with over 400 members by 2016 became the fastest growing cycling club in the UK.
Holmfirth Harriers is an over one hundred year old running group from the area.
Holmfirth Cricket Club plays just out of the centre of town next to the river Holme, there are also many local village football teams, such as the Holme Valley Academicals, playing in the Huddersfield District League.
Underbank Rangers, one of the most famous amateur Rugby League clubs are based in the town.

Transport

Rail

Holmfirth was served by a branch line, which diverged from the Huddersfield to Sheffield line (commonly referred to as the Penistone Line), this short, 2-mile (3 km), line branched from the mainline just south of Brockholes. A viaduct took the line across the valley and into Thongsbridge where a station was sited. The line then went along the side of the valley coming to a halt just outside the town centre on Station Road. Plans did exist for the line to be extended up the valley and then tunnel under Black Hill to join the Sheffield to Manchester line near Woodhead. The line closed to passengers in 1959, with goods traffic lasting until 1965. The station building and platform still remain as a private house. Other sections of the line further down the valley have been sold off for private housing and the viaduct, crossing the valley from the A616 (New Mill Road), at Brockholes, over Spring Wood, has been demolished.

Buses

Holmfirth bus station is located in the centre of Holmfirth from which regular bus services take varying routes around the outlying villages and to Huddersfield's bus and railway stations. Additional services run to the town, from Barnsley, Sheffield and Wakefield via Denby Dale or Penistone. Most services are operated by First Calderdale & Huddersfield, using the town's bus station. Saturday services operate to Glossop in north Derbyshire. In October 2006, First bus services were re-branded as the 'Holmfirth Connection'.

Culture

Holmfirth Choral Society

Holmfirth Choral Society hold regular classical choral music concerts in Holmfirth Civic Hall and the Holme Valley Orchestra plays throughout the year.

The town is particularly associated with an unusual choral folk song, known as the Holmfirth Anthem.

Holmfirth's Film Festival and Festival of Folk are held every May, and its Arts Festival takes place over two weeks in June.

Film festival
The town's cinema, the Picturedrome, which opened in 1912 as the Valley Theatre, is now a live music venue and has been nominated for the NME Best Small Venue. It hosts various music events. Acts such as Adam Ant, Bad Manners, Buzzcocks, Evile, Fish, Half Man Half Biscuit, Hawkwind, John Martyn, Ocean Colour Scene, the Red Hot Chilli Pipers, Ron Sexsmith, Saxon, Suzi Quatro and the Beat have performed.

Art week
Holmfirth Art Week, with its July exhibition in the Civic Hall, raises money for Macmillan Cancer Relief.

Holmfirth Festival of Folk
The Holmfirth Festival of Folk takes place in May of each year, featuring a wide selection of folk music and Folk Dance acts from around the UK. Performances take place in a variety of indoor and outdoor venues throughout the town.

Holmfirth Arts Festival
Holmfirth Arts Festival is a multi-arts festival which celebrates Creativity, Ideas, People and Landscape in the Holme Valley. Its ticketed, community engagement, outdoor arts and arts in the landscape programmes take place throughout the year, culminating in an annual four-day festival on the second weekend in June.

Brass bands
The Holme Valley Brass Band Contest takes place each year at the civic hall.

Surrounding villages
Holmfirth constitutes a town of its own almost seven miles (11 km) south of the larger town of Huddersfield. While the town of Holmfirth itself is comparatively small, it is surrounded by several hamlets and villages. These neighbouring settlements are often collectively referred to as "Holmfirth" and include:- Austonley, Arrunden, Burnlee, Cinderhills, Cliff, Deanhouse, Netherthong, Gully, Flushhouse, Hade Edge, Thongsbridge, Upperthong and Washpit. Many of these are located on Cartworth Moor.

Other villages and hamlets within the Holmfirth post town include:- Brockholes, Fulstone, Jackson Bridge, Hepworth, Holme, Holmbridge, Honley, Meltham, Netherthong, New Mill, Scholes, Totties, Thongsbridge, Upperthong, Longley, Hade Edge, Underbank and Wooldale.

References

External links

Holmfirth Arts Festival
Holmfirth Art Week
Holmfirth Cricket Club
Holmfirth Choral Society
Holme Valley Orchestra
Holmfirth Film Festival
An aerial photo of the town centre
Holmfirth Official Tourist Site
Holmfirth Choral Society at imdb.com
Holmfirth Cycling Club
Thongsbridge Cricket Club
Homfirth Town FC
Holmfirth Parish Church

 
Towns in West Yorkshire
Towns and villages of the Peak District
Geography of Kirklees
Holme Valley